Joe Fortunato may refer to:

 Joe Fortunato (American football) (1930–2017), former American football linebacker
 Joe Fortunato (coach) (1918–2004), American college sports coach and administrator
 Joe Fortunato (ice hockey) (born 1955), Canadian former ice hockey player
 Joe Fortunato (long snapper) (born 1994), American football long snapper